Bauru is a Brazilian municipality in midwestern region of the state of São Paulo.  It is the main city of the mesoregion and microregion of Bauru. The population is 379,297 (2020 est.) in an area of 667.68 km2. Established in 1896, its boundaries are Reginópolis to the north, Arealva to the northeast, Pederneiras to the east, Agudos and Piratininga to the south and Avaí to the west.

The presence of a strong service sector, many college campuses - including the University of São Paulo and Universidade Estadual Paulista - and the city's location at the junction of three railroads and three highways make Bauru a major urban center of the State of São Paulo.

It is the hometown of Marcos César Pontes, the first Brazilian in space. It is also the town where Pelé grew up and learned his football skills.

The city is served by two airports: the older Comte. João Ribeiro de Barros Airport and the newer Bauru-Arealva Airport, officially known as Moussa Nakhl Tobias Airport, located in the adjoining municipality of Arealva.

Origin of the name
There are various theories intended to explain the origin of the name Bauru. One was proposed by Ismael Marinho Falcão, an engineer who lived for many years with the Kaingang tribe, which used to inhabit the region. According to him, the region was called ubaurú because of the abundance of a herbaceous plant called ubá, used for hampers and wicker baskets, and urú, a ground bird related to the chicken.

Others think that the name comes from mbai-yuru, meaning 'waterfall' or 'river in strong declivity';  or ybá or uru, 'basket of fruits' in Old Tupi; or even bauruz, as the natives who inhabited the edges of the Batalha River were called.

History
Historically, the region occupied by Bauru was a disputed territory between two Indigenous groups: the Kaingang and the Guaraní. In the eighteenth century, ethnic Brazilian pioneers attempted to settle in São Paulo region, which was a crossing point of the monções (river expeditions) that went through Mato Grosso and Goiás, but they were prevented by local natives' attacks.
The non-Indians only managed to settle in the region in the nineteenth century with the coming of the population coming from São Paulo's coast as well the states of Minas Gerais and Rio de Janeiro. After 1850, in search of new land for occupation and colonization, pioneers from São Paulo and Minas Gerais began to explore the vast region between the Serra de Botucatu, Tietê River, Paranapanema River and Paraná River, until then inhabited by Kaingang indigenous groups.

In 1856, Felicissimo Antonio Pereira, coming from Minas Gerais, purchased land and settled, near the current center of Bauru, the Fazenda das Flores (Farm of Flowers). Years later, in 1884, this farm (also called Campos Novos de Bauru) have spun off part of its area for the training camp of the São Sebastião de Bauru. The district has progressed, even being subject to attacks of native Kaingang and relatively isolated from the rest of the state and became district of Agudos on 1888. The arrival of migrants from eastern São Paulo and Minas Gerais led to the emancipation of the city on August 1, 1896.

The new municipality at first lived from the cultivation of coffee, despite having weaker and infertile lands than the rest of the state. In 1905, Bauru was chosen as the starting point of the Estrada de Ferro Noroeste do Brasil, which linked by rail, Bauru to Corumbá, Mato Grosso do Sul, near the border with Bolivia. During the first half of the twentieth century, Bauru becomes the main economic hub of the region comprised by west São Paulo, northern Paraná and Mato Grosso do Sul.

Sports
The municipality is home to the professional association football team Esporte Clube Noroeste and Associação Bauru Basketball Team, 2014 Champion of the Liga Sudamericana de Básquetbol   and 2015 Champion of the FIBA Americas League. The team plays its home games at the Ginásio Panela de Pressão. Brazilian legend Pelé grew up here.

Sister cities
  Tenri, Japan, since 1970.
   Sibiu, Romania, since 1995.

Notable people
Diltor Opromolla, leprosy researcher
Ozires Silva, aeronautical engineer, founder of Embraer
Marcos Pontes, aeronautical engineer, astronaut

References

External links

 
  UOL.com.br, History of Bauru - Origin of Bauru.
  SP.gov.br, Official Website - Prefeitura Municipal de Bauru
 Embrapa.br, Aerial view of the city
Bauru
 , Site de Bauru

 
Populated places established in 1896